The Gridiron Club is the oldest and among the most prestigious journalistic organizations in Washington, D.C.

History 
Frank A. De Puy (1854–1927) was one of several who met January 24, 1885, at the Welcker's Hotel in Washington, D.C. – 721 15th Street, N.W., between New York Avenue and H Street – to form the Gridiron Club. De Puy was the last surviving founder of the club.

Its 65 active members represent major newspapers, news services, news magazines, and broadcast networks. Membership is by invitation only and was historically almost exclusive to prominent newspaper men, including newspaper Washington bureau chiefs.

For most of its history, the Club bylaws excluded women from becoming members or even guests at its annual dinner. Although the National Press Club began admitting women in 1971, the Gridiron was reluctant to follow suit. Women were first permitted as guests in 1972: several prominent women including several members of Congress, Coretta Scott King, and Katharine Graham, publisher of The Washington Post, were invited.

The Gridiron Club admitted the first woman journalist members in 1975: Helen Thomas of United Press International and Frances Lewine of the Associated Press. Helen Thomas would become the club's first woman president in 1993.

Eventually, the club began expanding beyond print journalism to include media figures such as Tim Russert of NBC News, Bob Schieffer of CBS News, Mara Liasson of National Public Radio, and Judy Woodruff of PBS.

The club merged with its charitable arm, the Gridiron Foundation, in 2008 to form the Gridiron Club and Foundation, a 501(c)(3) organization. The Club and Foundation make annual charitable contributions and provide scholarships to a number of journalistic organizations and colleges, including the University of Maryland, George Washington University, and Norwich University.

Officers
The presidency of the club rotates annually.  Carl Leubsdorf of the Dallas Morning News served as president in 2008, and Susan Page of USA Today in 2011, making them the first married couple to have each served as Gridiron president.  Chuck Lewis of Hearst Newspapers served in 2013.

Gridiron Club Dinner
The Gridiron Club is best known for its annual dinner which traditionally features the United States Marine Band, along with satirical musical skits by the members and remarks by the President of the United States and representatives of each political party.  The skits and speeches by various politicians are expected to be self-deprecating or otherwise sharply comedic.

Through 2020, every U.S. president since 1885 except Grover Cleveland has spoken at the dinner. (President Barack Obama attended the 2011 dinner after missing both the 2009 and 2010 dinners. In addition, he sang as a senator in 2006.) Bill and Hillary Clinton have both spoken at Club dinners, and the 2008 dinner marked the sixth time that President George W. Bush attended during his presidency. The 2013 dinner was the 125th Gridiron Club and Foundation Dinner, but technically only the fifth Club and Foundation dinner (following the 2008 merger of the Club and the Foundation into one entity).

The dinner is held in the spring, usually in March. Between 1945 and 2006, the dinner was held at the Capital Hilton. In 2007, it moved to the Renaissance Washington DC Hotel. It is one of the few remaining large-scale, white-tie affairs in Washington. It offers a neutral ground on which members of the press and various elected officials and political operatives can break bread together. The only time the club held its dinner and skits outside Washington was in November 1967 when it was held in Williamsburg, Virginia.

As is also true of the White House Correspondents' Association Dinner and the Radio and Television Correspondents' Association Dinner, the Gridiron Club Dinner has been subject to criticism that it encourages journalists to engage in undue coziness with the political officials they are supposed to fairly cover, and also that the public spectacle of "playing footsie" with reporters' main subjects is bringing the political press into disgrace.

For example, at the 2007 dinner, columnist Robert Novak impersonated Vice President Dick Cheney while satirizing the Scooter Libby case, which Novak helped initiate.

President Barack Obama attended the 2011, 2013, and 2015 Gridiron Club Dinners. President Donald Trump attended and addressed the 2018 Gridiron Club Dinner.

The Gridiron Dinner was not held in 2020 and 2021 due to the COVID-19 pandemic. The 2022 dinner on April 2 became a COVID superspreader event when at least 72 people tested positive, including Attorney General Merrick Garland, Agriculture Secretary Tom Vilsack, and Commerce Secretary Gina Raimondo. Proof of vaccination was required for entry, and no cases of serious illness were reported as resulting from the dinner.

See also
Radio and Television Correspondents' Association
White House Correspondents' Association
National Press Club (United States)
 Alfred E. Smith Memorial Foundation Dinner
 International Debutante Ball
 United States presidential inaugural balls
 Viennese Opera Ball in New York
 White House Correspondents' Dinner

References

External links
Guide to Gridiron Club of Washington, D.C. records, 1885-1906 housed at the University of Kentucky Libraries Special Collections Research Center
Library of Congress Collection donated by Gridiron Club of Washington, D.C.

Non-profit organizations based in Washington, D.C.
501(c)(3) organizations
American press clubs
Organizations established in 1885
1885 establishments in Washington, D.C.
Balls in the United States